William Fuller (born 1953) is a U.S. poet born in Barrington, Illinois. He received his bachelor's degree magna cum laude in English from Lawrence University in 1975. In 1983, Fuller received a Ph.D. in English from the University of Virginia, writing his dissertation on Sir Thomas Browne.

He published his first full-length book, byt, with the Oakland, CA-based publisher O Books in 1989. Some of Fuller's other books include The Sugar Borders (1993), Aether (1998), Sadly (2003), Watchword (2006), Three Replies (2008), and Hallucination (2011).

Some of Fuller's chapbook publications include The Coal Jealousies (1987), The Central Reader (1998), Three Poems (2000), Roll (2000), Avoid Activity (2003), Dry Land (2007), and Three Replies (2008). A biographical note published in Sadly calls attention to Fuller's twenty years of employment at The Northern Trust Corporation of Chicago, where he is senior vice president and chief fiduciary officer.

Selected bibliography
byt (1989) (Scalapino's Press, O books)
Sadly (2003) (Chicago: Flood Editions) 
Watchword(2006) (Chicago, IL: Flood Editions) 
Dry Land (2007)(Cambridge, UK: Equipage)
Three Replies (2009)(London, UK: Barque)  
Hallucination (2011) (Chicago, IL: Flood Editions)

Notes

References

External links
University of Chicago: Poem Present audio and video recordings of Fuller's reading at the University of Chicago October 30–31, 2003. Includes his lecture "A Restatement of Trysts"
A review of "Watchword" by poet William Allegrezza
William Fuller / Four Poems Four poems by Fuller published December 2010 in the on-line magazine Dear Navigator: "Blood Red Roses", "For Dally Kimoko", "Remembering What I (Should) Know", and "Zombieland"
Culture Industry - William Fuller: Watchword a "micro"-review that is a quick and illuminating glimpse into Fuller's poetics, by poet and Louis Zukofsky scholar / biographer Mark Scroggins
http://www.poetryfoundation.org/harriet/2011/05/rare-william-fuller-interview-posted-on-flood-editions/?woo
The Grounds Of Trust in William Fuller's "Watchword"

1953 births
Living people
People from Barrington, Illinois
University of Virginia alumni
Lawrence University alumni
Chapbook writers
20th-century American poets